"Realm of Kings" is a crossover comic book storyline published in 2010 by Marvel Comics. Written by Dan Abnett and Andy Lanning, it is a follow-up to the 2009 storyline "War of Kings" and introduced the setting known as the Cancerverse.

Publication history 
The series started with a Realm of Kings one-shot that establishes the setting and is followed by a number of separate series or storylines which focus on how the different characters, Imperial Guard, Inhumans, Guardians of the Galaxy and Nova, deal with this situation.

The storyline also includes the limited series Realm of Kings: Son of Hulk by Scott Reed, with art by Miguel Munera. This focuses on Hiro-Kala and his journey into the Microverse.

Plot summary 
A giant time-space tear called the Fault had been created by Black Bolt's T-Bomb, killing both himself and the Shi'ar leader Vulcan. The Fault becomes an immediate concern for both the Guardians of the Galaxy and the Nova Corps. They sent Wendell Vaughn, the first Quasar, into the Fault to scout it, given that his energy form would be able to survive its treacherous storms. Quasar soon finds that the Fault is actually a tunnel, leading to another universe which reeked of corruption, ruled by evil organic masses that had consumed their universe like a cancer. It is described as a Cancerverse, where "Life has won, Death has lost." He is captured by that universe's Avengers (called the Revengers), who plan on imposing their Earth on his, to enable their gods, the Many-Angled Ones, to continue to spread.

Titles 
 Realm of Kings (one shot)
 Realm of Kings: Imperial Guard #1-5
 Realm of Kings: Inhumans #1-5
 Guardians of the Galaxy (vol. 2) #20-24
 Nova (vol. 4) #31-35
 Realm of Kings: Son of Hulk #1-4

Collected editions

Aftermath 
Both the Nova and Guardians of the Galaxy series were put on hiatus following the conclusion of "Realm of Kings" and the events in the storyline lead directly into "The Thanos Imperative".

Also the conclusion of Son of Hulk intersects with the end of the back-to-back Hulk storylines  "Fall of the Hulks" and "World War Hulks" in the story arc  "Dark Son", partly written by Scott Reed.

References

External links 
 
 

Comics by Andy Lanning
Comics by Dan Abnett
Space opera comics